Alex Sharp, or variations, may refer to:

Alex Sharp (born 1989), English actor
Alex Sharp (American actor) (1921–2008), American actor, stuntman and writer 
Alex Sharpe (born 1972), Irish soprano singer and actress
Alexander John Ellis (1814–1890), born Alexander Sharpe, English mathematician, philologist and phonetician
Alexandra Sharp (born 1977), Australian basketball player